Pleasant Township is one of seven townships in Wabash County, Indiana, United States. As of the 2010 census, its population was 2,412 and it contained 1,020 housing units.

Geography

Unincorporated towns
 Disko at 
 Ijamsville at 
 Laketon at 
 Newton at 
(This list is based on USGS data and may include former settlements.)

Adjacent townships
 Lake Township, Kosciusko County (north)
 Jackson Township, Kosciusko County (northeast)
 Chester Township (east)
 Paw Paw Township (south)
 Henry Township, Fulton County (west)
 Perry Township, Miami County (west)
 Seward Township, Kosciusko County (northwest)

Cemeteries
The township contains these three cemeteries: Laketon, Pleasant Hill and Shiloh.

Lakes
 Brown Lake
 Long Lake
 Lotz Lake
 Lukens Lake
 Mc Calley Lake
 Mud Lake
 Round Lake

School districts
 Manchester Community Schools

Political districts
 Indiana's 5th congressional district
 State House District 22
 State Senate District 18

References
 United States Census Bureau 2007 TIGER/Line Shapefiles
 United States Board on Geographic Names (GNIS)
 IndianaMap

External links
 Indiana Township Association
 United Township Association of Indiana

Townships in Wabash County, Indiana
Townships in Indiana